The Brown County Courthouse located in Green Bay, Wisconsin. It was added to the National Register of Historic Places for its artistic and architectural significance in 1976. The courthouse is a waypoint on the Packers Heritage Trail.

History
The courthouse was designed by Charles E. Bell and completed in 1908. The original cost was $318,797.67. In 1992, it underwent renovations costing $10 million.

References

Courthouses on the National Register of Historic Places in Wisconsin
County courthouses in Wisconsin
Buildings and structures in Green Bay, Wisconsin
Beaux-Arts architecture in Wisconsin
Government buildings completed in 1908
National Register of Historic Places in Brown County, Wisconsin
1908 establishments in Wisconsin